Secret Weapon Revealed at Last is the fourth studio album by Country Teasers.

Finding it increasingly difficult for the entire band to congregate to perform or record, the album contains several older songs written between 1997 and 1998 and recorded  during the winter of 2002. The liner notes make mention that "Some members of the group were not present at the recordings".

Critical reception
The Times wrote that "the Country Teasers' determined pursuit of needling, off-the-cuff unpleasantness eventually wheedles the listener, against their will, into something approaching a state of grace". Chuck Eddy, in an article on "rant rock" for Spin, wrote admiringly that the album is a "belligerent pile of four-track crank catcalls".

Track listing 
All songs written by Ben Wallers.
"Success" – 3:17
"Hairy Wine 2" – 3:44
"Young Mums Up for Sex" – 3:00
"Deaths" – 4:38
"TODTTL" – 3:15
"Life Is a Rehearsal" – 4:22
"Full Moon Empty Sportsbag" – 1:05
"Boycott the Studio" – 3:07
"Wizmo!" – 4:01
"Please Stop Fucking Each Other" – 4:13
"Man v Cock" – 3:35
"Sandy" – 6:48
"EHWPSA" – 9:11

Personnel
B.R. Wallers – Guitar, Vocals, Other
S.W. Stephens – Bass
A.J.R. Mackinven – Guitar
R.A.McNeill – Guitar, Synthesizer
L.J.Worthington – Drums
Kaanan Tupper – Bass
Joe Patt – Drums
Leighton Crook – Drums
Sophie Politowicz – Drums

References

2003 albums
Country Teasers albums
In the Red Records albums